Jústinus Hansen (born 14 May 1985) is a Faroese international footballer who has played for Spjelkavik IL in Norwegian 3rd division, as a midfielder. He played for NSÍ Runavík from 2002 to 2011 and B68 Toftir from 2011 to 2012.

References

External links

1985 births
Living people
People from Saltangará
Faroese footballers
Faroe Islands international footballers
NSÍ Runavík players
B68 Toftir players
Spjelkavik IL players
Association football midfielders
Faroese expatriate footballers
Expatriate footballers in Norway
Faroese expatriate sportspeople in Norway